SLAY is a young adult novel by American author Brittney Morris published in 2019.

Plot 
SLAY tells the story of Kiera, a Black high school student who has developed and maintains the online game SLAY. Being tired of the racial harassment she has experienced in other online games, she created SLAY for Black gamers as a celebration of Black culture. The game SLAY is a VR multiplayer world where players duel using cards giving them powers based on Black culture. When a player in the game is killed by another player, the media criticises SLAY for being racist by excluding white players. 

The story is told from multiple perspectives, including that of Kiera, of her co-developer Claire, who is a computer science student in Paris, of John, a professor of African American studies, and of several other players of the game.

Major themes 
SLAY has been called "an incredibly raw and real depiction of modern Black identity struggles", and is referenced as an example of a novel exploring Black girlhood. It explores online harassment and racism in video games, as well as the pleasure of online gaming. The novel also portrays Black, trans gamers. 

The book has been described as "Ready Player One meets The Hate U Give".

Reception 
The novel was published by Simon Pulse after a bidding war between multiple publishers. 

Writing for the Book and Film Globe, Sharyn Vane called SLAY "a gaming-themed thriller and a compulsively-readable exploration of the many facets of black culture". Writing for The Seattle Times, Jordan Snowden writes that "“SLAY” is a book I wish I had when I was younger; not only does this young adult novel tackle big conversations in an approachable way, it features a strong, self-assured, intelligent young Black woman as the main character."

Awards and nominations 
SLAY was nominated for Best Novel (YA) in the 2020 Ignyte Awards. It has also won several other awards.

External links 

 SLAY book trailer on YouTube

References 

Young adult novels
English-language novels
Books about video games
Novels based on video games
Fictional video games
Novels about virtual reality
Novels set in Seattle
Novels set in Paris
Massively multiplayer online role-playing games in fiction
Literature by African-American women
2019 American novels
Novels about racism
Novels about the Internet
Novels with transgender themes